The 1971–72 South Carolina Gamecocks men's basketball team represented the University of South Carolina during the 1971–72 NCAA University Division men's  basketball season. This was the first year in which South Carolina played as an Independent. South Carolina finished 6th in the AP Poll for the third year in a row.

Roster

Schedule

Rankings

Gamecocks drafted into the NBA

References

South Carolina Gamecocks men's basketball seasons
South Carol
South Carol
South Car
South Car